Gur cake is a pastry confection traditionally associated with Dublin, Ireland. Known as chester cake in other areas of Ireland and elsewhere, and gudge or donkey's gudge in Cork, it is similar to what is termed flies graveyard in parts of the UK, and consists of a thick layer of filling between two thin layers of pastry. The filling is a dark brown paste, containing a mixture of cake/bread crumbs, dried fruits (sultana raisins etc.), and a sweetener/binder. It has traditionally been a cheap confection, made from bakery leftovers.

Its name is thought to be  a contraction of "gurrier cake". Children who skipped school were known as gurriers and the act of skipping school became known as to be 'on the gur'. As Gur cake was made of leftovers, it was one of the cheaper items in bakeries and, therefore, one of the few items affordable to a child 'on the gur'.

In Dublin, Gur cake is regarded as symbolic of working-class areas, being highlighted in books such as Gur Cake and Coal Blocks (1976) by historian Éamonn Mac Thomáis.

References

Irish cuisine
Pastries